The women's 4 × 100 metres relay event at the 1999 All-Africa Games was held on 16 September 1999 at the Johannesburg Stadium.

Results

References

4 x 100